The Boston Arena Christmas Tournament was a mid-season college ice hockey tournament with the first iteration played in late December 1953. It was held 17 times over a 18-year span and was discontinued after the 1970 edition.

History
The Boston Arena, which had served as a home for several college ice hockey programs, began hosting a tournament held between Christmas and new year's starting in 1953. Boston University, which then played its home games at the Arena, served as the host for the tournament. After a few years, Northeastern, who also played its home games at the Boston Arena, joined in on the tournament and served as co-host for the remainder of its existence.

During the first few years, the tournament format and even the number of teams changed annually. The first iteration was a simple, 4-team, single-elimination tournament. The following year, seven team participated but did not play an equal number of games. Two more teams were added for the third event while the fourth edition reverted to a more common 8-team tournament format. In years five and six, 6 teams were invited, however, the fifth version had all participants playing three games while the following year each team played two games with a tie-breaker being held between the two top teams on the final day. After 1960, the tournament settled down and became a more common 4-team tournament. After one year with a single-elimination format, it converted into a round-robin series and remained that way for several years. The tournament was last held in December 1970, after which, Boston University moved into the Walter Brown Arena.

Perhaps the most memorable game in the history of the tournament came in 1966 when Boston University met Cornell. Both teams were undefeated at the time and were widely regarded as the top two squads in the nation. The two played to a 3–3 tie after regulation and then went scoreless for 40 minutes of overtime. After the second extra period the head coaches for both teams met and agreed to call the game a draw as their respective teams were wore out and both had already proven to be the equal of the other. The two were named co-champions of the tournament.

Results

Note: The tournament was not held in 1963.

Game results

1953

1954
Round Robin

1955
Round Robin

1956

1957
Round Robin

1958
Round Robin

1959
Round Robin

1960
Round Robin

1961

1962
Round Robin

1964
Round Robin

1965
Round Robin

1966
Round Robin

1967
Round Robin

1968

1969

1970

Participating teams

References

 
 
 
 
 
 
 
 

College sports tournaments in Massachusetts
College ice hockey tournaments in the United States
Recurring sporting events established in 1953
1953 establishments in Massachusetts
1971 disestablishments in Massachusetts
Ice hockey competitions in Massachusetts